The 3 arrondissements of the Hérault department are:
 Arrondissement of Béziers, (subprefecture: Béziers) with 153 communes.  The population of the arrondissement was 309,800 in 2016.  
 Arrondissement of Lodève, (subprefecture: Lodève) with 122 communes.  The population of the arrondissement was 138,746 in 2016.  
 Arrondissement of Montpellier, (prefecture of the Hérault department: Montpellier) with 67 communes. The population of the arrondissement was 683,935 in 2016.

History

In 1800 the arrondissements of Montpellier, Béziers, Lodève and Saint-Pons were established. The arrondissements of Lodève and Saint-Pons were disbanded in 1926, and Lodève was restored in 1942. In 2009 the arrondissement of Montpellier lost the three cantons of Aniane, Ganges and Saint-Martin-de-Londres to the arrondissement of Lodève.

The borders of the arrondissements of Hérault were modified in January 2017:
 five communes from the arrondissement of Béziers to the arrondissement of Lodève
 one commune from the arrondissement of Béziers to the arrondissement of Montpellier
 seven communes from the arrondissement of Lodève to the arrondissement of Béziers
 26 communes from the arrondissement of Montpellier to the arrondissement of Lodève

References

Herault